Estelle Chen (born 4 March 1998) is a French-Chinese model.

Early life
Estelle Chen was born in Paris to Chinese parents from Wenzhou, a city in Zhejiang province.

Estelle was scouted by an agent of Elite Model Management in 2012. In 2013, she won Elite Model Look in France. She represented her country at the international contest at Shenzhen in China and placed in the top 15. She then signed a 3-years contract with Elite Model Management.

Career

She started walking the runway in September 2014, for Eudon Choi. In December, she was in an editorial for SKP Magazine. In January 2015, she walked for La Parla Atelier, the brand's first ever couture collection. In February, she advertised swimsuit brand Mikoh, filmed by Tim Mckenna in Bora Bora and in March ready-to-wear brand Luxe Deluxe.

Her breakout was during the F/W 15 fashion weeks, in March 2015, when she walked the runway for Nehera, Kenzo, LOEWE, Louis Vuitton and Miu Miu. In May, she walked the Dior Resort 2016 fashion show. She covered the June edition of Vogue Italia Beauty, photographed by Miles Aldridge. That same month, she walked the Dior fashion show in Tokyo. In July, she walked for Dolce & Gabbana, Dior, Alberta Ferretti, Elie Saab, Jean Paul Gaultier and Fendi. She was photographed by Juergen Teller for Louis Vuitton's Autumn/Winter 2015 lookbook. In September, she walked for Thakoon, Victoria Beckham, Opening Ceremony, Michael Kors, Boss, Preen by Thornton Bregazzi, David Koma, Issa, Antonio Berardi, Fay, Emilio Pucci, Dolce & Gabbana, Aquilano.Rimondi, Each x Other, Chloé, Paco Rabanne, Dior, Kenzo, Shiatzy Chen, Louis Vuitton et Miu Miu.

She walked in the 2017 & 2018 Victoria's Secret Fashion Shows.

References

External links

 
 

French female models
French people of Chinese descent
Miss World 2022 delegates
Models from Paris
Living people
1998 births
Ford Models models
Chinese female models
People from Wenzhou